The Men's World Floorball Championship is an international floorball competition contested by the senior men's national teams of the members of the International Floorball Federation (IFF), the sport's global governing body. It is distinct from the Women's World Floorball Championship, which is for women's teams. They were preceded by the European Championships which were held twice in 1994 and 1995. Originally played in May–June, the IFF decided in 2007 to move the tournament to early-December starting in 2008.

Men

Results

Medal table

Participation details

Men Under-19

Results

Medal table

Participation details

See also
List of floorball world champions
Women's World Floorball Championship

References

External links
Men's World Championships at IFF website

 
International floorball competitions
Floorball men
Recurring sporting events established in 1996
December sporting events